Mock the Week was a panel show that aired on BBC Two, and ran for 232 episodes. Hosted by Dara Ó Briain, the show featured a series of rounds where panellists satirised current events. In 2022, the 21st and final series of the show aired.

The show featured two teams of three, composed of regular panellists and various guest performers. Hugh Dennis appeared in every series, while other regulars included Frankie Boyle, Rory Bremner, Andy Parsons, Russell Howard, Chris Addison and Angela Barnes, who all featured for the entirety of at least one series.

Number of appearances per panellist 
Of the show's 232 episodes, 186 count towards the appearance table below. This does not include the 2011 Comic Relief special, or any of the show's Christmas specials and compilation episodes.

References

BBC-related lists
Lists of celebrities